William Kennedy Gibson (born 1876) was an Irish professional footballer who played as a full-back for Sunderland.

References

1876 births
Irish association footballers (before 1923)
Association football fullbacks
Cliftonville F.C. players
Sunderland A.F.C. players
Bishop Auckland F.C. players
Sunderland Royal Rovers F.C. players
English Football League players
Year of death missing